The 1500 metres speed skating event was part of the speed skating at the 1952 Winter Olympics programme. The competition was held on Monday, 18 February 1952 at 5 p.m. Thirty-nine speed skaters from 13 nations competed.

Medalists

Records
These were the standing world and Olympic records (in minutes) prior to the 1952 Winter Olympics.

(*) The record was set in a high altitude venue (more than 1000 metres above sea level) and on naturally frozen ice.

Results

The current world record holder Valentin Chaikin did not compete as the Soviet Union did not participate in Winter Games before 1956.

References

External links
Official Olympic Report
 

Speed skating at the 1952 Winter Olympics